Trevor Mitchell Bayne (born February 19, 1991) is an American professional stock car racing driver, dirt racing driver, team owner, and businessman. He last competed part-time in the NASCAR Xfinity Series, driving the No. 18 Toyota Supra for Joe Gibbs Racing and part-time in the American Crate All-Star Series presented by PPM, driving the No. 29 Longhorn Chassis for Trevor Bayne Racing. He is the youngest person to ever win the Daytona 500, the largest event in NASCAR, doing so a day after his 20th birthday in 2011. The win came in only his second race in NASCAR's top series, and was his only victory in 187 total Cup Series starts.

After losing his ride with Roush in 2018, Bayne opened and currently operates Mahalo Coffee Roasters in Knoxville, Tennessee as well as starting in 2021 driving a 602 Crate Late Model on a part-time basis for his own team that he shares with his younger brother Trey Bayne in the American Crate All-Star Series presented by PPM.

Racing career

Beginnings
Bayne was born in Knoxville, Tennessee in February 1991. He began racing go-karts at the age of five. He continued to race go-karts for eight years, during which he recorded three World Championships with more than 300 feature wins and 18 total State and Track Championships.

In 2003 he moved to Allison Legacy Series, where he became the youngest top rookie. The next year he became the series' National Champion, the youngest person ever to win the title. During the two years he raced in the series, he won 14 races, earned 19 pole positions and recorded 30 top-five finishes in only 41 starts.  In 2005,  When Bayne was 15 years old, he moved to the USAR Hooters Pro Cup Series Southern Division, in which he received the highest rookie honors. In 2008, he signed a contract with Dale Earnhardt, Inc. under their driver development program, racing in the NASCAR Camping World East Series, where he recorded one win, six top-fives, and seven top-10 finishes and finished fourth in point standings. One year later, he recorded Sunoco Rookie of the Race honors after participating in the Toyota All-Star Showdown at Irwindale Speedway. Also in 2009, he began racing in the Nationwide Series for Michael Waltrip Racing. After about two years with the team, he moved to Roush Fenway Racing, at the end of the season, and began racing in the Sprint Cup Series for Wood Brothers Racing.

Xfinity Series

2009–2010: Entry into the Xfinity Series
After DEI merged into Chip Ganassi Racing's shop following 2008, Bayne was inherited as a development driver by Ganassi. However, as Ganassi had shut down its Nationwide Series program after 2008, Bayne made his first Xfinity Series start in 2009 at Bristol Motor Speedway driving a Ganassi car carrying the No. 52 of Means Racing. Bayne finished in the 23rd position. He then signed a contract with Michael Waltrip Racing for a limited race schedule. In his first start for the team in the Federated Auto Parts 300 at Nashville Superspeedway, he qualified 2nd and finished 28th. He got the pole position at the Kroger 200 at Indianapolis Raceway Park and finished 7th at that race and the Virginia 529 College Savings 250 at Richmond.

During the 2010 season, Bayne  drove the No. 99 Out Pet Care Toyota Camry for Diamond-Waltrip Racing in 28 races before moving to Roush Fenway Racing. While with Michael Waltrip Racing in 2010, he recorded three pole positions, five top-fives and nine top-ten finishes. After announcing his departure from MWR after 2010, he was released and replaced with the Truex brothers Ryan Truex and Martin Truex Jr.

2010–2014: Roush Fenway Racing

In October 2010, Bayne signed a multi-year contract with Roush Fenway Racing. For the rest of 2010, Bayne drove the No. 17 Ford in the Nationwide Series. Over the complete 2010 season, Bayne ended up recording three pole positions, six top-five and eleven top-ten finishes, and finishing seventh in the final point standings.

For the 2011 season, Roush moved him to the No. 16 Nationwide Series car. He then went on medical leave for much of the spring. After recovering from his illness, Bayne made his return to racing at the STP 300 at Chicagoland Speedway on June 4, 2011, finishing third. He won his first Xfinity Series race at the Texas Motor Speedway on November 5, 2011, by edging out Denny Hamlin on a late race restart. Despite only competing in 29 of the 34 races, Bayne finished eleventh in points, recorded five top-five finishes, and fourteen top-ten finishes to go along with his Texas win.

For 2012, Bayne was moved by Roush to the No. 60 Ford in the Nationwide Series, however a lack of sponsorship sidelined the team after the first five races. Bayne came back to run one more race later in the season.

In 2013, Bayne replaced Ricky Stenhouse Jr. in the No. 6 Nationwide Series car, with Stenhouse moving up to the Sprint Cup Series full-time. On June 9, Bayne got his second career Xfinity Series victory by winning the DuPont Pioneer 250 at Iowa Speedway after Austin Dillon's handling went away.

Bayne returned to the No. 6 and RFR for the 2014 season. Advocare, previously a sponsor in the Cup Series and primary sponsor of Austin Dillon the prior two years, came on to sponsor the full season.

Bayne came close to many wins in the spring of 2014. He almost won at Dover and was edged by Kyle Busch for the win. In an interview he said "My team's improved significantly. This series is so tough this year and we've been on our game. But you want to be greedy and ask for more." He finished second again at Chicago after leading a few laps. He then took home $200,000 in the Dash-4-Cash program at the Iowa race and split it between him and a randomly chosen fan.

2022: Return To The Xfinity Series
On February 9, 2022, Joe Gibbs Racing announced that they had signed Bayne to drive the No. 18 in seven races. Bayne raced at Fontana, Phoenix in April, Charlotte in May, Nashville, Loudon, Vegas in October, and at Homestead. Bayne finished 3rd in his first race of  7 at Fontana. At Phoenix, he finished 4th. At Charlotte, he finished 9th. At Nashville, Bayne finished 2nd, and 2nd again at Loudon, Bayne wouldn't race again until October, where Joe Gibbs added an extra race to his schedule, as the originally scheduled driver of the No. 18 for the weekend Drew Dollar, backed out to focus on college, Bayne finished 13th as he got shuffled back on the final laps. Bayne finished 5th at Las Vegas and 6th at Homestead, his final race of the season.

Cup Series

2010–2014: Wood Brothers Racing

Bayne moved to the 2010 Sprint Cup Series and raced for the Wood Brothers Racing team in the Texas 500, starting 28th and finishing 17th. He returned to the Wood Brothers in 2011 for a limited schedule. He won the first race of the season, the Daytona 500, to become youngest winner in Daytona 500 history, at the age of 20 years and one day. This was the Wood Brothers' first win since the 2001 season when Elliott Sadler won at Bristol. Despite the big win, Bayne finished 40th the next week at Phoenix. The Daytona 500 win also granted Bayne eligibility for the NASCAR Sprint All-Star Race in 2011 and 2012. However, the Wood Brothers originally didn't have the sponsorship to run the non-points event or Talladega. The team later announced that Bayne would run the All-Star as well as the spring Talladega race with sponsorship from Camping World and Good Sam Club. After the Samsung Mobile 500, Bayne was hospitalized for a spider bite but was released that Wednesday. Bayne raced at Talladega, but was caught up in an early crash. However, Bayne's illness returned after racing at Nashville Superspeedway, and was hospitalized for five weeks, with his Nationwide ride being taken over by Chris Buescher, Kevin Swindell and Matt Kenseth. Bayne's Cup Series ride for the Coca-Cola 600 was driven by Roush Fenway teammate Ricky Stenhouse Jr. The illness was originally thought to be Lyme disease, but later that same year it was announced that Bayne had been diagnosed with multiple sclerosis. Bayne would return to the seat of the No. 16 and would win his first Nationwide race in Texas. For 2012, 2013, and 2014, Bayne returned to the No. 21 for a limited schedule.

2015–2018: Roush Fenway Racing
On May 24, 2014, RFR announced that Bayne would be running the No. 6 full-time in the Sprint Cup Series for the 2015 season. Near the end of the 2014 season, Bayne intended to run the No. 6 Advocare Cup car in a few races to get a head-start on his 2015 campaign. However, the plan was aborted after he failed to qualify in his first race at Charlotte in October. Bayne was not eligible to run for Rookie of the Year consideration, having spent four years running in several races.

Bayne qualified 15th in a controversial qualifying session for the Daytona 500. However, a crash during the first Budweiser Duel forced Bayne to a backup car. He got collected in a late-race accident involving Jeff Gordon, Reed Sorenson, Ricky Stenhouse Jr., and A. J. Allmendinger, but nonetheless finished the race on the lead lap.

After bad performances throughout the spring, Bayne had a good run going at the GEICO 500. While running 3rd, he lost control of his car and triggered a massive crash. In an interview following, he would blame dirty air for causing him to lose control and cause the crash. At Dover on May 31, 2015, Bayne got into an accident involving Justin Allgaier and Michael Annett. After the race Bayne was called to the Oval Office and fined $20,000 for violating a race procedure made in wake of the Kevin Ward Jr. accident in August 2014, in which a driver must remain in their car until being permitted by officials to exit (unless fire or smoke engulf the car).

Trevor Bayne got his first top ten of the year at Michigan, during the rain-delayed Quicken Loans 400. After an early speeding penalty, it looked like Bayne was set to finish a lap down. However, because several cars stayed out for the final yellow while the race leaders pitted, Bayne got his lap back and when the race was later called because of rain showers, Bayne had finished 9th. He picked up his first ARCA win at Pocono after starting first and dominating the race, and recorded another Cup Series top ten in the 2015 Coke Zero 400. Bayne's struggles would continue, as he would finish 40th in back-to-back races at Indianapolis and Pocono, being plagued by a major lack of speed at both tracks.

To start off 2016, Bayne would finish 28th in the Daytona 500. The next week at Atlanta, Bayne surprised many fans by qualifying 4th, but finished 22nd. In the following weeks, he finished 17th at Las Vegas, 23rd at Phoenix, 20th at Auto Club Speedway, 27th at Martinsville, 15th at Texas (after a fuel mileage gamble), and then a 5th-place finish at Bristol (getting his first top-5 of the year). The next week at Richmond he would finish 17th. The next week at Talladega, Bayne would have yet another strong race, as he would lead several laps and finish 10th. The next week at Kansas, he qualified 10th but ended up blowing a tire and finished 25th. The next week at Dover, his strong races would continue, when he finished 10th. The following week at Pocono, Bayne finished 25th place. The next week at Michigan, he finished 13th place. The next week at Sonoma, Bayne finished 15th place. The next week at Daytona, Bayne scored his third career top-5 finish with a 3rd place outing. The next week at Kentucky, it would come down to a fuel mileage race and Bayne would conserve enough fuel to finish 11th. The next week at New Hampshire, Bayne would finish 23rd. The next week at Indianapolis, Bayne would be involved in a wreck with Clint Bowyer on a Green-White-Checkered attempt and finish 30th.

It was announced on November 30, 2016, that Liberty National Insurance would become a sponsor for Bayne and the No. 6 car.

In February 2017, Bayne picked up his first top ten finish of the season at the 2017 Daytona 500. He ran as high as third and finished 10th. At the 2017 Brickyard 400, Bayne had a fantastic race that ultimately was his nearest-miss of his entire career. Thanks to a strategy call by Matt Puccia, Bayne moved up in the standings to fourth and was in a position to take the lead from Brad Keselowski when Keselowski, Kasey Kahne, and Jimmie Johnson pitted. His strategy was first thwarted by a caution that came out as soon as he took the lead, and after slipping in the standings from a pit stop found himself running fourth again. Bayne was about to take the lead on a restart, but got collected in an accident involving him, Ryan Blaney, Joey Logano and a few other cars. In a post-race interview, Bayne said, "I've never been more upset after a loss in my entire racing career. I say every week we give it all we have and we do it for God's glory and trust him with the results whether they're good or bad. It's hard to understand, but it hurts." Fellow driver Denny Hamlin blamed Bayne for the restart, though it showed that it was not Bayne's fault and later said to his crew that "He can't wait till his sponsorship money runs out".

Later in the year, he got two top 5s at Michigan and Bristol, and was running as high as 2nd with two laps to go at Michigan until he got loose in the corner and fell to 5th. At Talladega in the fall, he miraculously finished 3rd after his car was damaged from a couple of late race accidents and pushed by 6 drivers on the last lap and nearly beat Ryan Newman for second. He got another Top 10 running at Martinsville by passing a few cars on the last lap and finishing sixth, sideways across the line from a multi-car last lap crash.

Bayne finished 22nd in points for the second year in a row while breaking a new record for most Top 5s and Top 10s in a year, with 2 and 6, respectively. Liberty National would leave the team for Richard Childress Racing at the end of the year.

On April 14, 2018, SB Nation reported that former RFR driver Matt Kenseth would return to the team for select races in the No. 6, starting at Kansas in May, effectively demoting Bayne to part-time status for the remainder of the season. It marked Bayne's first part-time season since 2014.

After a long summer of poor finishes, it was announced on September 12, 2018, that Bayne would not return to the No. 6 Ford Mustang in 2019, making him a free agent.

2019: Free agent
After departing Roush Fenway Racing at the end of 2018, Bayne and his family returned home to Tennessee. During the 2019 offseason, Bayne constructed a farm in the state's countryside. In late June, the Bayne family opened the Mahalo Coffee Roasters store in Knoxville. Bayne later revealed that he had offers to drive, but did not have the sponsorship money necessary for any of them.

Truck Series
On August 31, 2020, Niece Motorsports announced Bayne would make his Truck Series debut in the team's No. 40 truck at Darlington. He would make his second consecutive start in the series for Niece at Richmond, replacing full-time driver Ty Majeski in the No. 45, as Majeski was out for undisclosed reasons. Bayne finished fifth at Bristol, but was disqualified when his truck failed the minimum height requirement during post-race inspection. At Talladega, he finished second after being beaten for the win by Raphaël Lessard as the caution came out on the final lap. After the race, he affirmed he would run the No. 45 for the rest of the 2020 season.

Personal life
Bayne is an outspoken Christian. He has credited his faith for helping him handle both the overnight success he experienced by winning the Daytona 500 as well as the health scare that took him away from racing briefly during the 2011 season. He has been on several mission trips to Mexico with Back2Back Ministries including one in December 2011. Bayne also attended Passion 2012 at the Georgia Dome and was recognized for his faith in front of approximately 45,000 college students during the final session of the conference.

On November 12, 2013, Bayne announced that he had been diagnosed with multiple sclerosis.

In December 2012, Bayne announced his engagement to Ashton Clapp. The couple were married on June 4, 2013, and had their first child, Elizabeth Kate in December 2015. Their son, Levi Jensen Bayne, was born on June 20, 2017. They welcomed their third child, a son named Luka, on September 19, 2019. Also in 2019, the couple opened Mahalo Coffee Roasters a coffeehouse chain in Knoxville, Tennessee. On December 11, 2021, their fourth child, a son named Jude was born.

Bayne is the older brother and team owner of American Crate All-Star Series presented by PPM driver Trey Bayne who shares the car with Trevor himself.

Motorsports career results

NASCAR
(key) (Bold – Pole position awarded by qualifying time. Italics – Pole position earned by points standings or practice time. * – Most laps led.)

Monster Energy Cup Series

Daytona 500

Xfinity Series

Gander RV & Outdoors Truck Series

Camping World East Series

K&N Pro Series West

 Season still in progress.
 Ineligible for series championship points.

ARCA Racing Series
(key) (Bold – Pole position awarded by qualifying time. Italics – Pole position earned by points standings or practice time. * – Most laps led.)

References

External links
 
 

Living people
1991 births
Sportspeople from Knoxville, Tennessee
Racing drivers from Tennessee
NASCAR drivers
CARS Tour drivers
People with multiple sclerosis
American Christians
ARCA Menards Series drivers
Dale Earnhardt Inc. drivers
Michael Waltrip Racing drivers
RFK Racing drivers
Joe Gibbs Racing drivers
Chip Ganassi Racing drivers